Micromyrtus sulphurea is a plant species of the family Myrtaceae endemic to Western Australia.

It blooms between July and November producing yellow flowers.

It is found on breakaways and among rocky outcrops in the Mid West region of Western Australia where it grows in sandy soils over laterite or granite.

References

sulphurea
Flora of Western Australia
Plants described in 1904